Yelena Timoshenko (born 6 October 1955) is a Russian former freestyle swimmer. She competed in three events at the 1972 Summer Olympics for the Soviet Union.

References

External links
 

1955 births
Living people
Russian female freestyle swimmers
Olympic swimmers of the Soviet Union
Swimmers at the 1972 Summer Olympics
Place of birth missing (living people)
Soviet female freestyle swimmers